Saraburi United Football Club (Thai สโมสรฟุตบอล สระบุรี ยูไนเต็ด), is a Thai professional football club based in Muak Lek, Saraburi, Thailand. The club is currently playing in the Thai League 3 Western region.

Timeline

History of events of Saraburi Football Club

Honours

Domestic leagues
Thai League 2
 Runner-up (1) : 2014
 Thai League 3 Western Region
 Winners (1): 2021–22
Regional League Central-East Division
 Winners (1) : 2010

Stadium and locations

Season by season record

P = Played
W = Games won
D = Games drawn
L = Games lost
F = Goals for
A = Goals against
Pts = Points
Pos = Final position
N/A = No answer

TPL = Thai Premier League

QR1 = First Qualifying Round
QR2 = Second Qualifying Round
QR3 = Third Qualifying Round
QR4 = Fourth Qualifying Round
RInt = Intermediate Round
R1 = Round 1
R2 = Round 2
R3 = Round 3

R4 = Round 4
R5 = Round 5
R6 = Round 6
GR = Group stage
QF = Quarter-finals
SF = Semi-finals
RU = Runners-up
S = Shared
W = Winners

Players

Current squad

Staff and management

References

External links 
 The official Facebook page of Saraburi United

Association football clubs established in 2000
Football clubs in Thailand
Saraburi province
2000 establishments in Thailand